The following musical events and releases are expected to happen in 2022 in Canada.

Events
 April 2 – 17th Canadian Folk Music Awards
 May 15 – Juno Awards of 2022
 June 13 – SOCAN Songwriting Prize
 July 8 – Prism Prize
 September 11 – 2022 Canadian Country Music Awards
 September 19 – 2022 Polaris Music Prize
 November 6 – 44th Félix Awards

Albums released

#
88Glam, Close To Heaven Far From God - August 26

A
Bryan Adams, So Happy It Hurts - March 11
Alexisonfire, Otherness - June 24
Altameda, Born Losers
Alvvays, Blue Rev - October 7
Matt Andersen, House To House - March 4
Anyway Gang, Still Anyways - May 6
Apollo Ghosts, Pink Tiger - March 11
Aquakultre, Don't Trip - July 22
Arcade Fire, We - May 6
Arkells, Blink Twice
Jann Arden, Descendant - January 28
Art d'Ecco, After the Head Rush
Shawn Austin, Planes Don't Wait - June 29
Aysanabee, Watin - November 4, 2022

B
Jason Bajada, Crushed Grapes
Tim Baker, The Festival - October 21
Adam Baldwin, Concertos & Serenades - September 23
Matthew Barber, No Singing or Dancing
Brad Barr, The Winter Mission - January 21
Basement Revolver, Embody - February 18
Bedouin Soundclash, We Will Meet in a Hurricane - October 28
Daniel Bélanger, Mercure en mai - October 14
Beppie, Nice to Meet You
The Besnard Lakes, The Besnard Lakes Are the Prayers for the Death of Fame
Billy Talent, Crisis of Faith - January 21
The Birthday Massacre, Fascination - February 18
Black Atlass, Infinite - August 5
Jully Black, Three Rocks and a Slingshot - September 23
Jean-Michel Blais, aubades - February 4
Blue Hawaii, My Best Friend's House - February 18
The Blue Stones, Pretty Monster - November 4
Bob Moses, The Silence in Between - March 4
Boslen, Gonzo
Broken Social Scene, Old Dead Young - January 14
Mariel Buckley, Everywhere I Used to Be - August 12
Basia Bulat, The Garden - February 25
By Divine Right, Otto Motto - September 30

C
Lou Canon, Reimagine the Body - January 26
Charbonneau & Amato, Synth Works Vol. 2 - March 4
Nuela Charles, TBA
Tanika Charles, Papillon de Nuit: The Night Butterfly - April 8
William Cloutier, On ira
Jason Collett, Head Full of Wonder - November 4
Counterparts, A Eulogy for Those Still Here - October 7

D
Destroyer, Labyrinthitis - March 25
Julie Doiron and Dany Placard, Julie & Dany - April 29
Dragonette, Twennies - October 28
Drake, Honestly, Nevermind - June 17
Drake and 21 Savage, Her Loss - November 4
Dvsn, Working on My Karma - October 28

E
Eccodek, Recalibrate - May 20
Elephant Stone, Le Voyage de M. Lonely dans la lune - February 18
Andre Ethier and Joseph Shabason, Fresh Pepper

F
Florian Hoefner Trio, Desert Bloom
Frontperson, Parade
Jeanick Fournier, Jeanick Fournier - October 7
Angelique Francis, Long River
Fucked Up, Do All Words Can Do - March 25

G
Ali Gatie, Who Hurt You? - August 12 
Geoffroy, Live Slow Die Wise - January 19
Ghostkeeper, Multidimensional Culture
Alice Glass, PREY//IV - January 28

H
Nate Haller, Party in the Back - November 18
Harm & Ease, Camino Loco
Georgia Harmer, Stay in Touch - April 22
Headstones, Flight Risk - October 14
Kevin Hearn, There and Then: Solo Piano Improvisations - February 11
Tim Hicks, Talk to Time - September 2
High Valley, Way Back - May 20
Andrew Hyatt, Four Good Years

I
iskwē and Tom Wilson, Mother Love
Iva and Angu, Katajjausiit

J
Emmanuel Jal, Shangah - July 8
Carly Rae Jepsen, The Loneliest Time - October 21
Berk Jodoin, Half-Breed
Joyful Joyful, Joyful Joyful - April 29
Junior Boys, Waiting Game - October 28

K
Kellarissa, Voice Leading
Francois Klark, Adventure Book
Pierre Kwenders, José Louis and the Paradox of Love - April 29

L
Avril Lavigne, Love Sux - February 25<ref>Allie Gregory, "Avril Lavigne Plots 2022 Headlining Canadian Tour". Exclaim!, November 26, 2021.</ref>
Lisa LeBlanc, Chiac Disco - March 18
Lights, Pep - April 1
Limblifter, Little Payne - October 31 
Les Louanges, Crash - January 21
Alexander Ludwig, Highway 99 - August 26
Lysandre, Sans oublierM
Mama's Broke, Narrow LineDan Mangan, Being Somewhere - October 28
Cory Marks, I Rise - November 11
Madeline Merlo, Slide - September 23
Metric, Formentera - July 10
Moist, End of the Ocean - January 14
MorMor, SemblanceDavid Myles, It's Only A Little Loneliness - September 23

N
Nickelback, Get Rollin' - November 18

O
OMBIIGIZI, Sewn Back TogetherJohnny Orlando, all the things that could go wrong – August 19
Our Lady Peace, Spiritual Machines 2 - January 28

P
Marcus Paquin, Our Love - November 25
Peach Pit, From 2 to 3 - March 4
Orville Peck, Bronco - April 8
PUP, The Unraveling of PUPTheBand - April 1

R
Josh Ramsay, The Josh Ramsay Show - April 8
Rare Americans, You're Not a Bad Person, it's Just a Bad World (July); Songs That Don't Belong (December)
Allan Rayman, Roadhouse 02 - March 18
The Reklaws, Good Ol' Days - November 4
Reuben and The Dark, In Lieu Of Light - September 9
Jessie Reyez, Yessie - September 16
Amanda Rheaume, The Spaces in BetweenRiver Tiber, Dreaming Eyes - December 9
Ariane Roy, Medium plaisirThe Rural Alberta Advantage, The RiseS
The Sadies,  Colder Streams - July 22
Jay Scøtt, Rap Queb Vol. 1Joseph Shabason and Nicholas Krgovich, At Scaramouche - October 7
Silverstein, Misery Made Me - May 6
Simple Plan, Harder Than It Looks - May 6
Sister Ray, CommunionSamantha Savage Smith, Fake Nice - April 22
Sloan, Steady - October 21
Stars, From Capelton Hill - May 27
Kiefer Sutherland, Bloor Street - January 21
Stereos, Cheap Thrills - November 4
Sykamore, Pinto - August 12

T
Tanya Tagaq, Tongues - March 11
Julian Taylor, Beyond the Reservoir - October 14
Three Days Grace, Explosions - May 6
Maylee Todd, Maloo - March 4
Tory Lanez, Sorry 4 What - September 30
Devin Townsend, LightworkV
Voivod, Synchro Anarchy - February 11

W
Patrick Watson, Better in the Shade - April 22
The Weather Station, How Is It That I Should Look at the StarsThe Weeknd, Dawn FM - January 7
Wild Rivers, SidelinesRoyal Wood, What Tomorrow BringsRoy Woods, Mixed Emotions - August 5

Y
Nikki Yanofsky, Nikki by Starlight - October 21
Young Guv, Guv III (March 11); Guv IV'' (TBA)

Deaths
January 17 - Karim Ouellet, singer-songwriter
February 3 - Donny Gerrard, rock singer
February 17 - Dallas Good, country/rock musician (The Sadies)
March 14 - Eric Mercury, songwriter
April 5 - Boris Brott, conductor
April 16 - Bill Bourne, folk musician
April 18 - Jerry Doucette, rock singer and guitarist ("Mama Let Him Play")
April 25 - Susan Jacks, pop singer
April 25 - Shane Yellowbird, country singer-songwriter
April 29 - Walter Rossi, rock singer and guitarist
May 29 - Ronnie Hawkins, rock singer
June 16 - Big Rude Jake, swing jazz singer-songwriter
August 7 - Gord Lewis, bassist (Teenage Head)
December 15 - Shirley Eikhard, singer-songwriter
December 29 - Ian Tyson, singer-songwriter

References